Vanadiocarpholite (Mn+2V+3AlSi2O6(OH)4) is straw yellow to brown silicate mineral. It crystallizes in the orthorhombic crystal system. It is the vanadium rich variety of carpholite (Mn+2Al2Si2O6(OH)4).

Discovery and occurrence
It was first described in 2005 for an occurrence in the Molinello Mine, Graveglia Valley, Genova Province, Liguria, Italy. It occurs in chert in a manganese ore deposit as vein fillings in silicified wood.

Chemical composition
It consists of:

References 

Inosilicates
Aluminium minerals
Manganese(II) minerals
Vanadium minerals
Orthorhombic minerals
Minerals in space group 68